The  Snowbirds, officially known as 431 Air Demonstration Squadron, are the military aerobatics flight demonstration team of the Royal Canadian Air Force. The team is based at 15 Wing Moose Jaw near Moose Jaw, Saskatchewan. The Snowbirds' official purpose is to "demonstrate the skill, professionalism, and teamwork of Canadian Forces personnel". The team also provides a public relations and recruiting role, and serves as an aerial ambassador for the Canadian Armed Forces. The Snowbirds are the first Canadian air demonstration team to be designated as a squadron.

The show team flies 11 CT-114 Tutors: nine for aerobatic performances, including two solo aircraft, and two spares, flown by the team coordinators. Additionally, 13 are maintained in storage. Approximately 80 Canadian Forces personnel work with the squadron full-time; 24 personnel are in the show team that travels during the show season. The Snowbirds are the only major military aerobatics team that operates without a support aircraft.

The Snowbirds continue the flying demonstration tradition of previous Canadian air force aerobatic teams, which include the Siskins, the Blue Devils, the Golden Hawks, and the Golden Centennaires.

Squadron history

Second World War
Although 431 Air Demonstration Squadron was formed in 1978, its history truly began during the Second World War when, as part of the Commonwealth contribution to aircrew for the war in Europe, 431 (Iroquois) Squadron Royal Canadian Air Force was created under the control of RAF Bomber Command.

Number 431 Squadron formed on 11 November 1942, at RAF Burn (in North Yorkshire), flying Wellington B.X medium bombers with No. 4 Group RAF Bomber Command. The squadron moved to RAF Tholthorpe in mid-1943 as part of the move to bring all RCAF squadrons into one operational group – No. 6 Group RCAF – and converted to Halifax B.V four-engined heavy bombers. In December 1943 the squadron moved to RAF Croft where it was re-equipped with Halifax IIIs and later, Lancaster B.X aircraft. 
The squadron moved to RCAF Station Dartmouth, Nova Scotia, after the war, disbanding there on 5 September 1945.

Battle honours

 English Channel and North Sea, 1943–44
 Baltic, 1943–44
 Fortress Europe, 1943–44
 France and Germany, 1944–45
 Biscay Ports, 1943–44
 Ruhr, 1943–1945 
 Berlin, 1943–44
 German ports, 1943–1945
 Normandy, 1944
 Rhine
 Biscay, 1943–44

Postwar

Squadron re-formed
No. 431 (Fighter) Squadron re-formed at RCAF Station Bagotville on 18 January 1954, using the new Canadair Sabre. The squadron was formed on a temporary basis until there were enough new CF-100s available to fulfill RCAF squadron needs. No. 431's duties included aerial combat training and displaying the capabilities of jet operations to the public at air shows, the largest being Operation Prairie Pacific: a 50-minute exhibition with aircraft from several squadrons that travelled to selected locations across western Canada. The team from No. 431 Squadron consisted of four Sabres and a solo aircraft. This was the first Sabre team to be authorized to perform formation aerobatics in Canada.  The unit was disbanded on 1 October 1954.

2 Canadian Forces Flying Training School Formation Team
 
In 1969, Colonel O.B. Philp, base commander of CFB Moose Jaw and former leader of the defunct Golden Centennaires aerobatic team, considered using several of the leftover Golden Centennaire CT-114 Tutor aircraft for another team. These Tutors were still fitted for aerobatic flying and, because of some minor corrosion, had been painted with white anti-corrosive paint. Philp, at this point, did not receive approval to form the new team; however, approval had been given for single Tutors to provide simple flypasts at local football games. 

To further the cause of an aerobatic team, Philp began informal enhanced formation practice for the instructors at 2 Canadian Forces Flying Training School with the aim of providing multi-aircraft flypasts at special events. In 1970, four-aircraft formations began providing flypasts at fairs and festivals, as well as Armed Forces Day at CFB Moose Jaw. In July 1970, a white Tutor was introduced to the formation for flypasts. Four white Tutors were finally flown together at the Abbotsford Air Show, followed by a flypast in Winnipeg. Known as the "2 Canadian Forces Flying Training School Formation Team", or informally as the "Tutor Whites", the team grew in size to seven aircraft in 1971 using eleven pilots, and gradually gained recognition. Formation flypasts were replaced with more complicated manoeuvres, and more aircraft were added as the team matured.

New name and squadron reactivation

A contest to give the air demonstration team a formal name was held at Bushell Park Elementary School at CFB Moose Jaw, and resulted in the name "Snowbirds". The name reflected the aircraft's distinctive mostly-white paint scheme used at the time, connoted grace and beauty and was clearly linked to its Canadian origins. The name was formally adopted on 25 June 1971. The Snowbirds were officially authorized to be designated the  "Canadian Forces Air Demonstration Team" on 15 January 1975, and was formed into its own squadron by reactivating 431 Squadron (renamed 431 Air Demonstration Squadron) on 1 April 1978.

The squadron badge has, since 1942, portrayed "an Iroquois' head adorned". In January 2021, the squadron began an initiative to remove this image from the badge.

Show routine

Formations and manoeuvres are designed each season by the team, and must be approved by the Canadian Forces, Transport Canada and the United States Federal Aviation Administration (FAA) to ensure safety guidelines are complied with. FAA approval is necessary since the team performs in the United States.

Three aerobatic shows are designed: a high show flown when weather is ideal, a low show and a flat show. The latter two are flown where some manoeuvres are not permitted because of cloud. A non-aerobatic show, or flypast, is also flown. Manoeuvres are arranged from those selected from the Standard Manoeuvre Manual. Some elements of the show are passed down from one season to the next. These include the Canada burst, heart, downward bomb burst, solo head on crosses, and their signature nine-abreast exit. Training occurs over several months. Once manoeuvres are mastered and the team is comfortable with the routine, the Snowbirds deploy to CFB Comox for specialized training. After approvals are obtained, an "acceptance show" is performed at Moose Jaw to allow representatives from the three approving agencies to see a live performance. The team will go on to perform shows throughout North America from May to October. The last show is performed at Moose Jaw.

Pilots typically stay with the Snowbirds for a maximum of three years, and one third of the pilots are replaced each year. Replacing pilots this way allows experienced members to train the new team members, which ensures that the Snowbirds' routines are consistent.

The Snowbirds were the first aerobatic team in the world to use music in their show, and music is often used with live commentary from the performing pilots.

Due to crashes in October 2019 and May 2020, restrictions were placed on shows beginning in 2021. To give pilots "more time to react", restrictions were placed on altitude and speed, and new rules were introduced concerning the minimum runway length permitted for Snowbird operations. Maintenance and inspections on the Tutors have also been increased.

Awards, honours, and ambassadorships
 In 1982, Canada Post released a 17¢ stamp of an inverted Snowbird No. 5 with the airframe number 114155.
 On 8 June 1994, the Snowbirds were awarded the 1994 Belt of Orion Award for Excellence by Canada's Aviation Hall of Fame.
 On 16 October 1999, the squadron was presented their squadron colour for 25 years of service. During the same ceremony the team was presented the 1999 Golden Hawks Award by the Air Force Association of Canada for outstanding performance in the field of Canadian military aviation.
 In 2002, the Snowbirds were named ambassadors of the Ch.i.l.d. Foundation (Children with Intestinal and Liver Disorders Foundation).
 On 28 June 2006, Canada Post released two domestic rate (51¢) stamps to commemorate the 35th anniversary of the team. The Royal Canadian Mint jointly released a $5 silver commemorative coin.

Notable performances

 The first performance of the team with the new name of "Snowbirds" was on 11 July 1971 at their home base of CFB Moose Jaw during the Homecoming '71 Air Show.
 The first performance of the Snowbirds in a foreign country occurred on 27 November 1971 at Williams Air Force Base near Phoenix, Arizona.
 The first formal public performance that included opposing solos was flown at Yellowknife on 13 May 1972.
 The air show at Inuvik, Northwest Territories, in 1974 was the first time that an aerobatic team had performed at midnight (daylight conditions north of the Arctic Circle).
 The first official air show performed by the Snowbirds as 431 (Air Demonstration) Squadron was on 28 April 1978 at Royal Roads Military College, Victoria, British Columbia.
 The opening ceremonies at the Calgary 1988 Winter Olympics was the first time the Snowbirds used coloured smoke. The colours represented the five colours of the Olympic rings.
 In 1990, red smoke was incorporated into the Snowbirds' routine at major performances to commemorate the team's 20th anniversary and the silver anniversary of the Canadian flag.
 The Snowbirds' 1000th official air show was performed on 20 May 1990 at CFB Edmonton (Namao).
 The team performed for the first time outside of Canada and the United States in October 1993 at Zapopan Military Air Base near Guadalajara, Mexico.

Notable staff
 Lois Boyle (1932–2012): in her role as a civilian senior administrative assistant to several base commanders of CFB Moose Jaw, Boyle was closely involved in the birth of the Snowbirds and also helping them mature into the 1980s. For her years of dedication and support to the team she earned the title 'Mother of the Snowbirds', and her funeral ceremony was marked with an honorary flyover by seven Snowbird jets.

Accidents and incidents

Incidents
Since the Snowbirds' first show in July 1971, there have been several incidents involving damage to airplanes, loss of airplanes, and loss of life. The following is a list of notable incidents only. There are other incidents, some involving loss of aircraft, that are not listed below.

Fatalities

Snowbird aircraft have been involved in several accidents, resulting in the deaths of seven pilots and two passengers and the loss of several aircraft. One pilot, Captain Wes Mackay, was killed in an automobile accident after a performance in Latrobe, Pennsylvania, in 1988. The RCAF commented: "... there is risk associated with formation flying. Flying by its very nature has an inherent element of risk. Eight Snowbird pilots have lost their lives in the performance of their duty. We remember them."

 10 June 1972: Solo Captain Lloyd Waterer died after a wingtip collision with the other solo aircraft while performing an opposing solo manoeuvre at the Trenton Air Show at CFB Trenton, Ontario.
 3 May 1978: Captain Gordon de Jong died at an air show in Grande Prairie, Alberta. The horizontal stabilizer failed, rendering the aircraft uncontrollable. Although pilot ejection was initiated, it was not successful.
 3 September 1989: Captain Shane Antaya died after a midair collision during a demonstration at the Canadian International Air Show during the CNE in Toronto, Ontario, when his Tutor crashed into Lake Ontario.  During the same accident, team commander Major Dan Dempsey safely ejected from his aircraft.
 10 December 1998: Captain Michael VandenBos died in a midair collision during training near Moose Jaw.
 10 December 2004: Captain Miles Selby died in a midair collision during training near Mossbank, Saskatchewan, while practising the co-loop manoeuvre. The other pilot, Captain Chuck Mallett, was thrown from his destroyed aircraft while still strapped into his seat. While tumbling towards the ground, he was able to unstrap, deploy his parachute and land with only minor injuries.
 18 May 2007: Snowbird 2, Captain Shawn McCaughey fatally crashed during practice at Malmstrom Air Force Base near Great Falls, Montana, due to a restraining strap malfunction.
 9 October 2008: A Snowbird Tutor piloted by newly recruited team member Captain Bryan Mitchell with military photographer Sergeant Charles Senecal crashed, killing both, near the Snowbirds' home base of 15 Wing Moose Jaw while on a non-exhibition flight.
 17 May 2020: A Snowbird Tutor crashed in Kamloops, British Columbia, during a cross-country tour called "Operation Inspiration", intended to "salute Canadians doing their part to fight the spread of COVID-19." Unit public affairs officer, Captain Jennifer Casey, died. The pilot, Captain Richard MacDougall, sustained serious injuries. The final report of the Directorate of Flight Safety concluded that both personnel ejected "at low altitude and in conditions that were outside safe ejection seat operation parameters."

Aircraft replacement

Due to the age of the Tutors (developed in the 1950s, first flown in 1960, and accepted by the RCAF in 1963), a 2003 Department of National Defence study recommended that the procurement process to replace the aircraft should begin immediately so the aircraft could be retired by 2010 because of obsolescence issues that would affect the aircraft’s viability. The report mentions that "with each passing year, the technical, safety and financial risk associated with extending the Tutor into its fifth decade and beyond, will escalate". Some concerns include the inevitability of metal fatigue and parts failure, outdated ejection seats and antiquated avionics. There has also been criticism about the aircraft not being representative of a modern air force. 

A 2008 review recommended that the Tutors' life could be extended to 2020 because of cost concerns related to purchasing new aircraft, and a 2015 report called "CT-114 Life Extension Beyond 2020", outlined planned upgrades to extend the life of the Tutor beyond 2020. These planned upgrades included replacing the ejection seats and wing components, and updating the brakes.  

The Government of Canada had plans to replace the Tutors with new aircraft between 2026 and 2035 via the Snowbird Aircraft Replacement Project whose aim was "to satisfy the operational requirement to provide the mandated Government of Canada aerobatic air demonstration capability to Canadian and North American audiences.". The preliminary estimated cost was $500 million to $1.5 billion. Official sources were quoted: "The chosen platform must be configurable to the 431 (AD) Squadron standard, including a smoke system, luggage capability and a unique paint scheme. The platform must also be interchangeable with the training fleet to ensure the hard demands of show performances can be distributed throughout the aircraft fleet." However, the Snowbird Aircraft Replacement Project was discontinued and replaced by the Tutor Life Extension Program implemented by a contractor (L3 Harris) that is meant to extend the use of the Tutor fleet to 2030. The Tutors will receive modernized avionics to comply with regulations and permit the team to continue flying in North America. The glass cockpit canopies will also be upgraded.

References

Notes

Bibliography

 Dempsey, Daniel V. A Tradition of Excellence: Canada's Airshow Team Heritage. Victoria, British Columbia, Canada: High Flight Enterprises, 2002. .
 
 Fast, Beverley G. Snowbirds: Flying High, Canada's Snowbirds Celebrate 25 Years. Saskatoon, SK: Lapel Marketing & Associates Inc., 1995. .
 Milberry, Larry. Canada's Air Force At War And Peace, Volume 3. Toronto, ON: CANAV Books, 2000. .
 Milberry, Larry, ed. Sixty YearsThe RCAF and CF Air Command 1924–1984. Toronto: Canav Books, 1984. .
 Mummery, Robert. Snowbirds: Canada's Ambassadors of the Sky. Edmonton, Alberta, Canada: Reidmore Books, 1984. .
 Rycquart, Barbara. The Snowbirds Story. London, Ontario, Canada: Third Eye, 1987. .
 Sroka, Mike. Snowbirds: Behind The Scenes With Canada's Air Demonstration Team. Toronto, Ontario, Canada: Fifth House Publishers, 2006. .

External links

 Canadian Forces Snowbirds (official site)
 431 Squadron (Department of Defence – History and heritage)
 Squadron history at Canadian Wings
 Watch a 1980 NFB vignette on the Snowbirds

Canadian Forces aircraft squadrons
Royal Canadian Air Force squadrons
Canadian ceremonial units
National symbols of Canada